Frank West Hewlett (1913 in Pocatello, Idaho – July 7, 1983) was an American journalist and war correspondent during World War II. He was the Manila bureau chief for United Press at the outbreak of war, and was the last reporter to leave Corregidor before it fell to the Japanese.

Education
Hewlett obtained his degree from Idaho State University. He was later a Nieman Fellow at Harvard University.

Career
Hewlett worked 23 years as the Washington bureau chief of The Salt Lake Tribune. Throughout his career he has worked as a reporter for Japan Times, The Seattle Times, Spokane Spokesman-Review, Tulsa World, Albuquerque Journal, Honolulu Star-Bulletin, and Guam Daily News.

Hewlett's limerick poem, "the Battling Bastards of Bataan" came to symbolize that campaign:

Departing Corregidor before it fell, at the instruction of Douglas MacArthur, Hewlett followed Frank Merrill in the China-Burma-India theater, then coined the term Angels of Bataan. His wife, Virginia, working for the High Commissioner to the Philippines, remained in Manila. She was interned at Santo Tomas Internment Camp and was not part of the prisoner exchange in the early part of the war, to his disappointment. They reunited during the raid to free the survivors in February 1945.  She died in 1979. Later he would briefly work for the Department of Defense before returning to the private sector.

Hewlett was a member of Sigma Delta Chi and the National Press Club.

Awards and honors
He won the National Headline Award in 1942 from his reporting of Bataan and Corregidor.

Death
Hewlett died at the age of 74 in Arlington, Virginia from bronchial pneumonia. He was survived by his sister, daughter, and two grandchildren.

References

American male journalists
Year of birth uncertain
1983 deaths
1913 births
American war correspondents
20th-century American writers
20th-century American journalists
20th-century American male writers
Idaho State University alumni
Nieman Fellows